KDGL (106.9 FM,  "The Eagle") is a classic hits /classic rock station serving the Coachella Valley and Morongo Basin markets of inland Southern California.  Artists featured on the station include Aerosmith, The Beatles, Boston (band), Jim Croce, The Eagles, Foreigner, Billy Joel, Elton John, Lynyrd Skynyrd, Fleetwood Mac, Styx, The Steve Miller Band, and many others.

KDGL's studios are located at 1321 North Gene Autry Trail in Palm Springs, California.  KDGL's main transmitter is located on the southeast corner of Yucca Valley, California, just north of Joshua Tree National Park.

External links
KDGL Website
KDGL Transmitter Location (Google Maps)
KDGL-FM1 Booster Location (Google Maps)

REC Broadcast Query for KDGL

DGL
Alpha Media radio stations
Yucca Valley, California
Radio stations established in 1988
1988 establishments in California